Kawase (written:  or ) is a Japanese surname. Notable people with the surname include:

 Akiko Kawase (actress) (born 1980), Japanese voice actor
 Hasui Kawase (1883–1957), Japanese painter
 Masataka Kawase (1840–1919), Japanese shishi (political activist) and diplomat
 Naomi Kawase (born 1969), Japanese film director
 Shiro Kawase (1889–1946), Japanese admiral
, Japanese gymnast
 Tomoko Kawase (born 1975), Japanese singer
 Yukari Kawase (born 1967), Japanese volleyball player

Japanese-language surnames